The 2009 World Aesthetic Gymnastics Championships, the 10th edition of the Aesthetic group gymnastics competition, was held in Moscow, Russia from June 04 to 06, at the Druzhba Multipurpose Arena.

Participating nations

Medal winners

Results

References

External links
http://www.ifagg.com
https://ifagg.sporttisaitti.com/

World Aesthetic Gymnastics Championships
International gymnastics competitions hosted by Russia 
2009 in gymnastics